The 1940 Aldershot by-election was held on 26 November 1940.  The by-election was held due to the succession to the peerage of the incumbent Conservative MP, Roundell Palmer.  It was won unopposed by the Conservative candidate Oliver Lyttelton.

References

Aldershot
Aldershot by-election
Aldershot by-election
20th century in Hampshire
Aldershot by-election
By-elections to the Parliament of the United Kingdom in Hampshire constituencies
Unopposed by-elections to the Parliament of the United Kingdom (need citation)